The , also known by its nickname of "Midori no U-Line", is one of the two lines of the Kobe Municipal Subway. It links the central districts to the east and western suburbs of Kobe. The line color is  green.

Service pattern 

History
On 15 October 1971, a railway license was issued to the Kobe Municipal Transportation Bureau to build a subway line linking the Myōdani district to the Shin-Kobe Shinkansen station; construction on the first segment of that line began on 25 November of that year. The first segment of the subway (between Shin-Nagata and Myodani, known as the Seishin Line) opened on 13 March 1977; a second segment of the line (between Shin-Nagata and Okurayama, known as the Yamate Line) opened on 17 February 1982. The line was extended to Shin-Kobe on 18 June 1985; a western extension to Gakuen-toshi (from Myodani) opened that same day. On 18 March 1987, the final segment of the subway line opened between Gakuen-toshi and Seishin-chūō.

The Hokushin Kyuko Electric Railway opened on 2 April 1988, providing service between Tanigami and Shin-Kobe. An infill station opened in between Seishin-chūō and Ikawadani stations on 20 March 1993, expanding the line to a total of 16 stations. On 17 January 1995, the subway line was shut down due to damage caused by the Great Hanshin earthquake; the line resumed operation with limited service between Seishin-chūō and Itayado the following day, along with the entirety of the Hokushin Kyuko line. Limited service was resumed across the entire line on 16 February, and full service was restored in March 1995 after repairs were completed, albeit with speed restrictions remaining in place until 21 July of that year.

The subway began to accept the Surotto Kansai smart card in October 1999; it would start accepting PiTaPa in October 2006.

Women-only cars began to be used on the subway line from 16 December 2002. Currently, one car heading in the direction of Seishin-chūō (car number 4) is reserved for women only; the restriction applies throughout the entire day.

Stations

Rolling stock 

 1000 series (since 1977) (18 sets)
 2000 series (1988–2022) (4 sets)
 3000 series (1992–2021) (6 sets)
 6000 series (since 2019) (25 sets)
 Hokushin Kyuko Railway 7000 series (since 1988) (5 sets)

All trains are based at Tanigami and Myōdani Depots.

A fleet of new trains (known as the 6000 series) is to be introduced on the line between fiscal 2018 and 2022; these trains will replace all existing trains on the line. Built by Kawasaki, the design of the new trains will be overseen by Ken Okuyama Design.

The last of the 2000 series sets were retired in March 2021.

See also
 List of railway lines in Japan

References

External links
Seishin-Yamate Line

Kobe Municipal Subway
Transport in Kobe
Railway lines in highway medians